12 Angry Lebanese: The Documentary is a 2009 Lebanese documentary film directed, written and produced by Zeina Daccache, which chronicles efforts to stage an adaptation of Reginald Rose's 1954 teleplay Twelve Angry Men with inmates inside Beirut's Roumieh Prison It premiered at the 2009 Dubai International Film Festival.

Production 
The film was directed, written and produced by Zeina Daccache.

Awards 
The documentary won the following awards—
 Muhr Arab Documentary — First Prize 
 People's Choice Award at Dubai International Film Festival (2009)
 First prize — audience award at the DOX BOX International Documentary Festival (2010)

References 

Lebanese documentary films
2009 documentary films
2009 films
Documentary films about the penal system
Documentary films about theatre
Twelve Angry Lebanese: The Documentary